The Artificial Intelligence Act (AI Act) is a regulation proposed on 21 April 2021 by the European Commission which aims to introduce a common regulatory and legal framework for artificial intelligence. Its scope encompasses all sectors (except for military), and to all types of artificial intelligence. As a piece of product regulation, the proposal does not confer rights on individuals, but regulates the providers of artificial intelligence systems, and entities making use of them in a professional capacity.

The proposed regulation classifies artificial intelligence applications by risk, and regulates them accordingly. Low-risk applications are not regulated at all, with Member States largely precluded via maximum harmonisation from regulating them further and existing national laws relating to the regulation of design or use of such systems disapplied. A voluntary code of conduct scheme for such low risk systems is envisaged, although not present from the outset. Medium and high-risk systems would require compulsory conformity assessment, undertaken as self-assessment by the provider, before being put on the market. Some especially critical applications which already require conformity assessment to be supervised under existing EU law, for example for medical devices, would the provider's self-assessment under AI Act requirements to be considered by the notified body conducting the assessment under that regulation, such as the Medical Devices Regulation.

The proposal also would place prohibitions on certain types of applications, namely remote biometric recognition, applications that subliminally manipulate persons, applications that exploit vulnerabilities of certain groups in a harmful way, and social credit scoring. For the first three, an authorisation regime context of law enforcement is proposed, but social scoring would be banned completely.

The act also proposes the introduction of a European Artificial Intelligence Board which will encourage national cooperation and ensure that the regulation is respected.

Like the European Union's General Data Protection Regulation (GDPR), the AI Act could become a global standard. It is already having impact beyond Europe; in September 2021, Brazil’s Congress passed a bill that creates a legal framework for artificial intelligence.

The European Council adopted its general approach on the AI Act on 6 December 2022. Germany supports the Council's position but still sees some need for further improvement as formulated in an accompanying statement by the member state.

See also 

 Ethics of artificial intelligence
 Regulation of algorithms
 Regulation of artificial intelligence
 Algorithmic bias

References

External links 

 Proposal for a Regulation of the European Parliament and of the Council Laying Down Harmonised Rules on Artificial Intelligence (Artificial Intelligence Act) on EUR-Lex
 Procedure 2021/0106/COD on EUR-Lex
 Procedure 2021/0106(COD) on ŒIL

Policies of the European Union
European Digital Strategy
2021 in law
2021 in the European Union
Regulation of robots
European Union regulations